Negro Creek is a stream in Wyoming, United States.

Negro Creek was known as Nigger Creek until the name was changed in the 1960s.

See also
List of rivers of Wyoming

References

Rivers of Converse County, Wyoming
Rivers of Natrona County, Wyoming
Rivers of Wyoming